Alvogen is an American pharmaceuticals company founded in 2009. In 2014, a controlling stake in the company was acquired by CVC Capital Partners and Temasek Holdings. Alvogen has about 350 different medical and non-medical products, and both produces its own products and markets the products of brand name pharmaceutical companies.

History
Alvogen was founded in 2009 by Robert Wessman, who stepped down from his position as CEO of Actavis in order to found the company. Soon after its founding it had 200 products in development. Since 2012, Alvogen has acquired three different companies in Taiwan and South Korea (Alvogen Korea), where it operates as Lotus Pharmaceuticals (which Alvogen purchased in 2014 for $200 million) and is listed on Taipei Stock Exchange (1795.TT). In 2015, Alvogen acquired DreamPharma for $187 million. It is also the parent company of Norwich Pharmaceuticals, which does the firm's manufacturing. 

In 2015, a controlling interest in Alvogen was acquired by CVC Capital Partners and the Singapore sovereign fund Temasek.  As of 2017, the company had 2800 employees spread over thirty-five countries. In 2016, Alvogen also acquired the US company County Line Pharmaceuticals for $300 million. In 2017, Alvogen was valued at $4 billion.

Pharmaceuticals 
Alvogen markets 350 different products including generic drugs, branded medicines, biosimilar products, cosmetics, and food supplements, for areas including oncology, cardiology, pulmonology, and neurology. Much of its products for European markets are manufactured at a factory in Romania, and packaged in Serbia. Companies that market their products through Alvogen or have sold their generic drugs to Alvogen for sale, include Bayer, Mylan, Natco, and Pfizer. 

In 2017, Alvogen partnered with Vivus to provide the anti-obesity drug phentermine/topiramate to the South Korean market and partnered with Omega Bittner to provide products in the Russian market. In 2017, Alvogen also became the first company to bring a generic oseltamivir to the US market. That year, Alvogen had 75 additional products under review with the FDA for approval for sale in the US market.

Alvotech
Alvogen has a subsidiary company called Alvotech that researches biosimilars, which was founded in 2013 by Alvogen founder Robert Wessman. It expects to launch its product line in 2020, committing $300 million to its research and development. Alvotech is based out of Iceland, and it has four research and production sites across Europe.

Controversies 
In November 2022, Alvogen and a former executive settled a dispute over allegations of bullying made the previous year. 

In September 2021, Swedish doctor Essam Mansour, who invested $500,000 in Alvogen in 2009, accused Robert Wessman as the CEO of Alvogen of excluding him from participation in the company and of presenting his views at company meetings without his authorisation. Wessman denied doing so.

References

External links
Official website

Pharmaceutical companies based in New Jersey
Pharmaceutical companies established in 2009
Pharmaceutical companies of South Korea
Companies listed on the Korea Exchange
Temasek Holdings